Maud of Lancaster (4 April 1340 – 10 April 1362), also known as Matilda, Countess of Hainault, was a 14th-century English noblewoman who married into the Bavarian ducal family.

The eldest daughter of Henry of Grosmont, 1st Duke of Lancaster and Earl of Leicester, and his wife Isabel de Beaumont, she was born at Bolingbroke Castle in Lindsey.

Marriages
She was married firstly to Ralph Stafford, son of Ralph Stafford, 1st Earl of Stafford, whilst still a child. Following his death, she married secondly, in 1352, to William I, Duke of Bavaria, a member of the Wittelsbach Bavarian royal family.

Inheritance

The Duchy of Lancaster (First Creation) became extinct upon her father's death in 1361, however Maud became co-heiress, with her sister Blanche of Lancaster, to her father's estates and remaining titles. The title Earl of Leicester passed to her second husband who was confined due to insanity from 1358 until death in 1389, whilst the Earldom of Lancaster passed to her younger sister's husband, John of Gaunt. Maud died a year later without surviving issue (her only child, a daughter by William V, having died in 1356), so the remainder of her father's inheritance passed to Blanche and John of Gaunt upon her death. That inheritance provided the political and financial foundation of the House of Lancaster, with the Lancastrian King Henry IV of England being Maud's nephew.

Ancestry

References

Citations

Sources
 Mosley, Charles (ed.) Burke's Peerage and Baronetage, 106th edition. (Crans: Burke's Peerage, 1999) vol. 1, p. 228.
 Weir, Alison. Britain's Royal Families: The Complete Genealogy (London: The Bodley Head, 1999), p. 76.

1339 births
1362 deaths
Maud
Maud
Leicester
Daughters of English dukes
Maud
Countesses of Holland
Countesses of Hainaut
14th-century German women
14th-century German nobility
14th-century English nobility
14th-century English women